Olmeca Tequila is a tequila produced in Jalisco, Mexico. Olmeca is owned by the Pernod Ricard Group.

There are three tequilas in the Olmeca family: Olmeca, Olmeca Altos and Olmeca Tezón - all of which contain Tahona Liquid.

Production 

Olmeca Tequila is made from blue agave, picked after 7–8 years of growth. Once harvested, traditional brick ovens are then used to slow cook the piñas.

Part of the production process involves using the 500-year-old traditional and artisan Tahona method, which consists of a 2-ton millstone made of volcanic rock, known locally as Tezontle. Once the agave piñas have been harvested and cooked, they are crushed by the Tahona, creating a pulp and drawing out the sweet juice from the fibers. This juice is referred to as Tahona Liquid, of which a percentage is integrated into the fermentation and distillation processes of all Olmeca Tequilas, with Olmeca Tezón exclusively containing 100% Tahona Liquid, certified by the Consejo Regulador del Tequila.

Origins 

Olmeca Tequilas are produced at Destileria Colonial de Jalisco. The operation at the plant is overseen by Maestro Tequilero Jesús Hernández and his team of workers. The Master Distiller is responsible for supervising all production, from the harvest of the plants in the agave fields to the bottling of the tequila. The Olmeca distillery is situated in the town of Arandas, Jalisco, the unofficial capital of Los Altos (2104 meters above sea level), taking advantage of the blue agave plants that are grown locally.

See also
 Henry Besant

References

External links
Official website
 https://www.olmecatequila.com/
 https://www.tequilaolmeca.com/ 

Mexican brands
Pernod Ricard brands
Tequila